2009–10 Pirveli Liga was the 21st season of the Georgian Pirveli Liga.

Standings

Top scorers

See also
2009–10 Umaglesi Liga
2009–10 Georgian Cup

External links
Georgia 2009/10 RSSSF

Erovnuli Liga 2 seasons
2009–10 in Georgian football
Georgia